Forst is a village in the canton of Bern, Switzerland. The former municipality of the district of Thun merged with Längenbühl on January 1, 2007 to form Forst-Längenbühl.

Geography
Forst is a settlement with scattered building in the moraine landscape of Upper Gürbetal. The most important boroughs are Dörfli, Allmid (Allmend), Chromen, Längmoos, and Riedhubel. Of the entire municipal territory of 185 hectares, 79.7% is used for agriculture, 11.8% is forested, and a mere 8% is used for settlements.

Politics
The Municipal President of Forst is Hans Burkhalter.

Transportation
Forst is connected to the public transportation grid via Bus Line 51 Thun-Forst-Blumenstein of Verkehrsbetriebe STI.

References

External links

Villages in the canton of Bern
Former municipalities of the canton of Bern